Shorea polyandra (called, along with some other species in the genus Shorea, yellow meranti) is a species of tree in the family Dipterocarpaceae. It is endemic to Borneo.

References

polyandra
Endemic flora of Borneo
Trees of Borneo
Taxonomy articles created by Polbot